Whitney Young High School may refer to:
Whitney Young Magnet High School in Chicago
Whitney M. Young Gifted & Talented Leadership Academy in Cleveland